Paul Flowers may refer to:
Paul Flowers (banker) (born 1950), businessman, church minister and former bank chairman
Paul Flowers (footballer) (born 1974), English former footballer

See also
Flowers (name)
Flower (name)